The Bangladesh Gazette is the official gazette of the Government of the People's Republic of Bangladesh published from Dhaka, Bangladesh.

History
The gazette traces its origin to the Dhaka gazette which was published on 15 August 1947 by the East Bengal government. The Bangladesh Gazette was formed on 7 December 1973. It has information on corp production, government appointments, weather and birth rates etc.

See also
 List of newspapers in Bangladesh

References

Publications established in 1947
Newspapers published in Dhaka
English-language newspapers published in Bangladesh
1947 establishments in East Pakistan
1973 establishments in Bangladesh